Callyspongia is a genus of demosponges in the family Callyspongiidae.

Species 
The following species are recognised in the genus Callyspongia:

Subgenus Callyspongia (Callyspongia) Duchassaing & Michelotti, 1864

Subgenus Callyspongia (Cavochalina) Carter, 1885

Subgenus Callyspongia (Cladochalina) Schmidt, 1870

Subgenus Callyspongia (Euplacella) Lendenfeld, 1887

Subgenus Callyspongia (Toxochalina) Ridley, 1884

Subgenus unassigned

References 

Callyspongiidae
Sponge genera